Presidency of Migration Management  (PMM) (Turkish: Göç İdaresi Başkanlığı) is the administrative, legislate and operational central-governmental authority responsible for overall migration and international protection affairs in Turkey.  It is tasked with coordination of international labor, education, health, social policy and security. It cooperates very closely with relevant governmental institutions in diverse areas of migration.

The institution was established during Turkey's migrant crisis under the Ministry of the Interior.

Organization

Central Organization
Combating Irregular Migration Department 
Department of the Protection of Victims of Human Trafficking
Foreign Relations Department
Foreigners Department
Harmonization and Communication Department
Information Technologies Department
International Protection Department
Migration Policies and Projects Department
Office of Legal Counsellor
Strategy Development Department
Support Services Department
The Head of Personnel Department
Training Department

Local Organization
81 "Provincial Migration Management" directorates (in each province)

Overseas Organization
Migration Counsellors
Migration Attaches

See also
Immigration to Turkey
Turkey's migrant crisis

References

Organizations based in Ankara
2015 establishments in Turkey